Gordon Lloyd Chavunduka (c.16 August 1931 – 11 January 2013) was a Zimbabwean sociologist and traditional healer.

Biography
He served as a member of Abel Muzorewa's delegation to the 1979 Lancaster House Conference that led to Zimbabwe's independence. He has published several books on traditional medicine.

Prof. Chavunduka was Vice Chancellor of the University of Zimbabwe from 1992 to 1996. After his retirement from the university, he served as president of the Zimbabwe National Traditional Healers Association. He was a great influence to Christopher Chetsanga.

Death
Chavunduka died on 11 January 2013 at the age of 81 in Harare, after a short illness.

References

Heads of universities and colleges in Zimbabwe
2013 deaths
Traditional African medicine
1930s births
Date of birth unknown
Academic staff of the University of Zimbabwe